A Perfect Man is a 2013 film directed by Kees Van Oostrum.

Plot
A wandering man (Schreiber) has an affair with the wrong woman, leading to a separation.

Cast
Jeanne Tripplehorn as Nina
Liev Schreiber as James
Joelle Carter as Lynn
Louise Fletcher as Abbie
Renée Soutendijk as Martha
Huub Stapel as Pieter
Katie Carr as Laura

Critical reviews
The Hollywood Reporter John DeFore describes the script as deficient.

Critical response
On review aggregator Rotten Tomatoes, the film has an approval rating of 20% based on 5 reviews, with an average rating of 4.77/10.

References

External links

 
 
 
 

2013 films
2013 drama films
American drama films
2010s English-language films
2010s American films